Robert-Rudolf Volk (8 February 1921 – 10 March 2021) was an Estonian militant sculptor. He was also a member of the Estonian Defence League.

Biography
In 1938, Volk joined the Järva County regiment of the Estonian Defence League due to rising tensions in Europe. He was joined by a classmate from  whose father fought in the Estonian War of Independence. He fled the country during the Soviet occupation of the Baltic states but returned during the German occupation to study economics at the University of Tartu. In 1943, he was mobilized to join the Wehrmacht and assigned to the 36th Estonian Police Battalion, which sent him to Nevel. After World War II, he hid in the woods for two years but was eventually tracked down and imprisoned in 1946.

After his release in 1948, Volk began working as a sculptor. He continued this profession until 2008, when he retired.

Robert-Rudolf Volk died on 10 March 2021 at the age of 100.

References

1921 births
2021 deaths
Estonian centenarians
Men centenarians
20th-century Estonian sculptors
20th-century Estonian male artists
21st-century Estonian male artists
People from Järva County
German Army personnel of World War II
Soviet sculptors